Li Shanshan (born 3 March 1987) is a Chinese professional basketball player for China women's national basketball team. She was part of the squad for the 2012 Summer Olympics.

References

1987 births
Living people
Chinese women's basketball players
Basketball players at the 2012 Summer Olympics
Basketball players at the 2016 Summer Olympics
Olympic basketball players of China
Basketball players from Jiangsu
Sportspeople from Nanjing
Point guards
Jiangsu Phoenix players